Patricia Mary Byson Flower (23 February 1914 – 2 September 1977) was an English Australian writer of plays, television plays and novels.

Biography
She was born in Ramsgate, Kent, England and moved to Australia with her family in 1928. She originally worked as a secretary, writing radio plays and sketches in her spare time. She eventually moved on to writing crime novels and TV scripts.

She wrote so many episodes of the ABC TV series Australian Playhouse one critic called it "The Pat Flower Show".

She was married to Cedric Flower, an actor, costume designer, designer, playwright, director, playwright, producer and set designer (1920-2000)
 
Flower committed suicide in New South Wales, Australia in September 1977.

Select writings
Port of Message (1949) – revue at New Theatre – contributing writer
Love Returns to Umbrizi (1958) – radio play – writer
From the Tropics to the Snow (1961) – film script
The Prowler (1966) – television play
You've Never Had It So Good (1965–66) – revue at New Theatre – contributing writer
Fiends of the Family (1966) – novel – adapted for TV in 1968
The Tape Recorder (1966) – television play
Marleen (1966) – television play
Done Away with It (1966) – television play
Anonymous (1966) – television play
The Lace Counter (1966) – television play
The V.I.P.P. (1966) – television play
Easy Terms (1966) – television play
The Empty Day (1966) – television play
The Heat's On (1967) – television play
Tilley Landed On Our Shores (1967) – television play – won Dame Mary Gilmour Award
Exposure 70 (1970) – revue at New Theatre – contributing writer
Dynasty (1971) – episodes of series inc "Who Wants A Bridge"
Catwalk (1972) – episodes of seriesThe Tape Recorder (1972) – play adaptation of television playNumber 96 (1972) – episode of seriesWhat's New (1973) – revue at New Theatre – contributing writerThe Alchemist (1982) – adaptation of Ben Johnson play – performed at New Theatre

Inspector Swinton series of crime novelsWax Flowers for Gloria (1958)Goodbye Sweet William (1959)A Wreath of Water-Lilies (1960)One Rose Less (1961)Hell for Heather (1962)Term of Terror (1963)Fiends of the Family (1966)Hunt the Body (1968)Cobweb (1972)Cat's Cradle (1973)Odd Job (1974)Slyboots (1974)Vanishing Point (1975)Crisscross (1976)Shadow Show'' (1976)

References

External links
Biography at Australian Crime Fiction

1914 births
1977 suicides
20th-century Australian novelists
Australian women novelists
20th-century Australian women writers
British emigrants to Australia
Suicides in New South Wales